Lars Klevstrand (born 30 September 1949) is a Norwegian singer, guitarist, composer and actor. He was born in Drammen, Buskerud, the son of Olav Klevstrand and Grethe Sofie Larsen, and was brought up in Bærum.

Career 
His debut album  was Vi skal ikkje sova from 1968. In 1970, he published the songbook Gjøglerhåndbok. Among his albums from the 1970s were På stengrunn from 1973 (a cooperation with Lillebjørn Nilsen, Kari Svendsen and others), Riv ned Gjerdene! from 1976, and Høysang from 1978. His album Viser til Mariann from 1983 was awarded Spellemannprisen. He made his debut as actor at Det Norske Teatret in 1975, in a cabaret on Jacques Brel which run for 250 performances. He has later played in musicals at Nationaltheatret, at Chateau Neuf, at Oslo Nye Teater and at Sogn og Fjordane Teater. He was awarded the prize Målblomen in 1970, Prøysenprisen from 1991, and Gammleng-prisen. He was a member of the board of Norges Kunstnerråd from 1993 to 1995, and a board member of the Nordic House in the Faroe Islands from 1995 to 2000.

Honors 
1970: Målblomen
1983: Spellemannprisen in the category Folk, for the album Ola Skutvik og Mariann Kirans tunes
1987: Gammleng-prisen
1991: Prøysenprisen

Discography 
1968: Vi Skal Ikkje Sova
1969: Dobbeltportrett – with Hege Tunaal
1972: Til Dere
1973: På Stengrunn – with Lillebjørn Nilsen, Steinar Ofsdal, Kari Svendsen, Jon Arne Corell and others
1974: Twostep og Blå Ballader
1975: Live (2lp)
1976: Riv Ned Gjerdene – with Guttorm Guttormsen
1977: Ballade! På turné – with Ballade!
1978: Høysang – with Guttorm Guttormsen kvintett
1979: To I Spann – with Steinar Ofsdal
1981: Frie Hender
1982: Canto General - with Arja Saijonmaa
1983: Visions
1983: Ola Skutvik og Mariann
1985: Glassberget
1987: Her
1989: I Fløyterens Hjerte
1991: Så Lenge Hjärtat Kan Slå
1995: Å, Dette Hjartet
1996: Sang For Vinden
2001: Vinternatt
2001: Himlajord
2004: Nomadesongar
2006: Sundslegen, Herja og Naken

References

1949 births
Living people
Musicians from Drammen
Musicians from Bærum
Norwegian male singers
Norwegian composers
Norwegian male composers
Norwegian male stage actors
Norwegian male musical theatre actors
Spellemannprisen winners